Farqad Sabakhi (died 729) was an Armenian Islamic preacher and an associate of Hasan al-Basri.   He was thus one of the Tabi'een (i.e. of the generation that succeeded the Sahabah).  Farqad as-Sabakhi was a Christian who converted to Islam. As-Sabakhi was known for his ascetic lifestyle and his knowledge of Judeo-Christian scriptures.

See also
 Sufism
 Islam in Armenia

References

8th-century deaths
Tabi‘un
People from Basra
Converts to Islam from Christianity
Muslim missionaries
Ethnic Armenian Muslims
Armenian former Christians
Year of birth unknown
Tabi‘un hadith narrators